Roland Ramsay Duncan (6 February 1879 – 22 March 1958) was an Australian rules footballer who played with Collingwood in the Victorian Football League (VFL).

Notes

External links 

Roland Duncan's profile at Collingwood Forever

1879 births
1958 deaths
Australian rules footballers from Melbourne
Collingwood Football Club players
People from Templestowe, Victoria